William W. Allen (June 7, 1908 – June 20, 1992) was a former Republican member of the Pennsylvania House of Representatives.

References

Republican Party members of the Pennsylvania House of Representatives
1908 births
1992 deaths
20th-century American politicians